Kutscha, or Kutsche, is a Bohemian noble family. The noble family branch is descended from Ambros Kutscha (1769 in Kremsier – 16 October 1845 in Prague), Doctor of Laws, who served as a judge (Hofrat) and later as Vice President (from 1842) of the High Court of the Kingdom of Bohemia (Appellations- und Criminal-Obergericht in dem Königreiche Böhmen). He was awarded the knight's cross of the Order of Leopold on 12 January 1837, an award which conferred hereditary nobility and the rank and title of Ritter (knight). He was subsequently known as Ambros, Ritter von Kutscha.

References

Bohemian noble families